Player names marked in bold went on to earn full international caps.

Group A

Indonesia
Indonesia named their squad on 10 October 2018.

Manager: Indra Sjafri

United Arab Emirates
United Arab Emirates named their squad on 4 October 2018.

Manager:  Ludovic Batelli

Qatar
Qatar named their squad on 10 October 2018.

Manager:  Bruno Pinheiro

Chinese Taipei
Chinese Taipei named their squad on 7 October 2018.

Manager: Vom Ca-nhum

Group B

Japan
Japan named their squad on 2 October 2018.

Manager: Masanaga Kageyama

Iraq
Manager: Qahtan Chathir Drain

Thailand
Thailand named their squad on 15 October 2018.

Manager: Issara Sritaro

North Korea
Manager: Ri Chol

Group C

Vietnam
Vietnam named their squad on 11 October 2018.

Manager: Hoàng Anh Tuấn

South Korea
South Korea named their squad on 12 October 2018.

Manager: Chung Jung-yong

Australia
Australia named their squad on 6 October 2018.

Manager: Ante Milicic

Jordan
Jordan named their squad on 4 October 2018.

Manager: Ahmed Abdel-Qader

Group D

Saudi Arabia
Manager: Khaled Al-Atwi

Tajikistan
Tajikistan named their squad on 9 October 2018.

Manager: Mubin Ergashev

China PR
China named their squad on 15 October 2018.

Manager: Cheng Yaodong

Malaysia
Malaysia named their squad on 15 October 2018.

Manager:  Bojan Hodak

References

External links
, the-AFC.com

2018 AFC U-19 Championship
AFC U-19 Championship squads